Culcita is a genus of ferns, native to the Americas, Macaronesia and Iberian Peninsula. It is the only genus in the family Culcitaceae in the Pteridophyte Phylogeny Group classification of 2016 (PPG I). Alternatively, the family may be treated as the subfamily Culcitoideae of a very broadly defined family Cyatheaceae, the placement used for the genus in Plants of the World Online .

Species
Only two species are known:

References 

Cyatheales
Fern genera